Niumataiwalu was a Verata high chief who was the father of  Roko Rasolo and his siblings who became  the Vuanirewa siblings or clan in Lau. The name Niumataiwalu, translated as 'I came first at Walu beach' was in memory of his grandfather-Tuivanuakula 2 or Tuinaosara (also known as Kubunavanua) for winning the leadership race competition among Rokomautu's seventeen (17) grandchildren at Walu beach, Verata. He was the father of Uluilakeba 1

Qoma was the elder brother of Delaivugalei; the latter the father of Niumataiwalu. Both were sons of Kalouyalewa, who was the brother of Buivaroro (the second Tui Nayau), and they had one sister, Adi Keletu was married to Noco in Rewa. Kalouyalewa's father was Tuivanuakula 2 and otherwise known as Tuinaosara.

Niumataiwalu killed his uncle Qoma and his sons, in retribution for the murder of his own parents and sibling. This series of events eventually paved the way for his descendants overlordship of both these islands and the rest of Lau. In establishing his dynasty he is often recognised as the first Sau of the Lau Islands. The Vuanirewa clan was established later by his children.

Legend, scandal and death
Traditional legend has it that Niumataiwalu was renowned not only for his valour in battle but also for his beauty. This latter attribute would eventually attract the attention of one of the noble ladies of Bau, causing an illicit affair and leading to his eventual demise, for the lady was Adi Davila of Nairai, the Radini Levuka, wife of the Vunivalu or Paramount Chief of the Kubuna Confederacy. The adulterous affair did not come to light until the Radini Levuka, Adi Davila realized she was pregnant, and though she wasn't harmed, the Vunivalu, bided his time and planned revenge for this offence upon himself and his noble household. He tendered the support of two Ono-i-Lau chiefs, Saunikalou and Radua who were visiting Bau at the time and were subjects of Niumataiwalu, by presenting them with a tabua made of black stone and requesting for the murder of their overlord.

In time Niumataiwalu visited Matokano Village in Ono-i-Lau and a welcoming feast was accordingly prepared for him. This was also an occasion the two conspiring chiefs saw as an opportunity to exact the earlier instructions of the Vunivalu. As all weapons were forbidden in the area where the kava ceremony was to take place, Saunikalou hid a war club in a hollowed out banana stem and instructed his young son to play with it as a toy where the ceremony occurred. When the first appropriations of kava drink was being given to Niumataiwalu, unsuspecting he lowered his head, at which the same time Saunikalou grabbed the hidden weapon and struck him. The first blow did not kill Niumataiwalu, and he fled towards the beach in the hope of gaining aid from some of his men. He was however overpowered by Saunikalou and his men, and was clubbed to death.

Local legend states that the area where Niumataiwalu was killed is cursed for the spilling of his noble blood. The vegetation in this area called "Cuga" still retains a whitish tinge amidst a surrounding area of deep green, as it is believed by locals to be cursed. Due to its tragic history, this area is the only place on the island not belonging to the people of Ono-i-Lau as it traditionally belongs to the Vuanirewa and remains so today. In the 20th century, the Vuanirewa descendants of Niumataiwalu made attempts to retrieve his remains for reburial in Tubou, Lakeba.

Lineage
Niumataiwalu had three wives from which he had many children. Four of his sons would eventually in turn succeed to his title. The recorded wives and children of this chief in order of seniority were:
By wife of Vunivalu of Bau, the Radini Levuka
Ratu Banuve Baleivavalagi (father of Ratu Tanoa Visawaqa)
By his first wife Tarau of Tovu Totoya
Sivoki
Uluilakeba I
Rasolo
Mokoi
By his second wife Uma of Nukunuku
Matawalu
By his third wife (name unknown) from Cakaudrove
Lubati

References

 Yalo i Viti: Shades of Viti : a Fiji Museum Catalogue - Page 173 by Fergus Clunie, Fiji Museum, Julia Brooke-White - 1986; following is a snippet: Leha died trying to save Niumataiwalu, the father of the first Tui Nayau to rule Lakeba. Ironically, Niumataiwalu, who was assassinated at Ono in a plot...
 Folk-Lore: A Quarterly Review of Myth, Tradition, Institution, and Custom, Page 119 by Sidgwick; By Folklore Society, (Great Britain), Parish Register Society, (Great Britain), Published 1977, Northern Micrographics for Brookhaven Press, Original from the University of Michigan, Digitized Jul 14, 2006. Following a snippet: In the island of Lakemba, Fiji, the nobility is all descended from Niumataiwalu.It is divided into four clans, which I will call A, B, C, and D....

Fijian chiefs
People from Lakeba
Vuanirewa
Year of death unknown
Year of birth unknown
People from Nayau
Confederacies of Fiji
Vunivalu of Bau